The Dude is a 1981 studio album by the American musician and producer Quincy Jones. Jones used a lengthy list of studio musicians.

Three singles were released from the album in the US, all of which charted on the US Top 40. "Just Once" and "One Hundred Ways" both feature vocalist James Ingram's debut and reached No. 17 and 14, respectively, on the Billboard Hot 100. The album gained moreover heavy dance airplay for lead single "Ai No Corrida", which reached No. 28 on the Top 40 and 14 in the UK Singles Chart. The album also contains "Razzamatazz" (with vocals by Patti Austin) which reached No. 11 in the United Kingdom, Jones's biggest solo hit in that country.

The Dude was nominated for twelve Grammy Awards (including Album of the Year) and won three at the 24th Grammy Awards: for Best Instrumental Arrangement; Best R&B Performance by a Duo or Group with Vocal; and Best Instrumental Arrangement (Accompanying Vocalists). It also earned Ingram three Grammy nominations for Best New Artist, Best Male Pop Vocal Performance (for "Just Once") and Best Male R&B Vocal Performance (for "One Hundred Ways"), which he won.

Track listing

Personnel 
Personnel adapted from album's liner notes.

 Quincy Jones – producer (all tracks), vocal arrangements (1–4, 7), rhythm arrangements (1, 3, 4, 8), synth arrangements (1, 4, 6), backing vocals (2)
 Patti Austin – lead vocals (4–6, 9), backing vocals (1–6, 9), vocal arrangements (1)
 Tom Bahler – backing vocals (1, 5)
 Michael Boddicker – voice synthesizer (2)
 Robbie Buchanan – acoustic piano and synth strings (3)
 Mike Butcher – engineer (8)
 Lenny Castro – handclaps (2, 9)
 Ed Cherney – assistant engineer (all tracks)
 Kasey Cisyk – backing vocals (6, 9)
 Paulinho da Costa – percussion (1–6, 8, 9), mouth percussion (1)
 Chuck Findley – trumpet (1, 3, 5–7, 9)
 David Foster – electric and acoustic piano (3)
 Jim Gilstrap – backing vocals (1, 2, 5)
 Bernie Grundman – mastering
 Herbie Hancock – electric piano (1, 5, 6, 9)
 Jerry Hey – trumpet (1–3, 5–7, 9), horn arrangements (1–3, 5–7, 9), synth arrangements (1, 4, 6, 9), string arrangements (6, 9)
 Craig Hundley – beam-microtonal tubulons
 Kim Hutchcroft – saxophone (1–3, 5–7), flute (2, 3, 5–7)
 James Ingram – lead vocals (2, 3, 7), backing vocals (2)
 Michael Jackson – backing vocals (2)
 Louis Johnson – bass (1, 2, 4, 5, 7, 8), handclaps (1, 2, 4, 9)
 Abraham Laboriel – bass (3, 9)
 Yvonne Lewis – backing vocals (6, 9)
 Steve Lukather – guitar (1, 3–7, 9), guitar solo (1, 6)
 Johnny Mandel – string and synth arrangements (3, 7, 8)
 Charles May – lead vocals (1)
 Greg Phillinganes – synthesizer (1, 3–6, 8, 9), electric piano (2–4, 7–9), handclaps (1, 4), synthesizer solo (7)
 Bill Reichenbach Jr. – trombone (1, 3, 5–7, 9)
 John Robinson – drums (all tracks), handclaps (1, 2, 4, 9)
 Bruce Swedien – engineering and mixing (all tracks)
 Rod Temperton – rhythm and vocal arrangements (2, 5, 6, 9), synth arrangements (5, 6, 9)
 Toots Thielemans – guitar, harmonica and whistle (8)
 Ian Underwood – synth programming (1, 3–9)
 Gerald Vinci – concertmaster (3, 6–9)
 Lalomie Washburn – backing vocals (2)
 Ernie Watts – saxophone (1–3, 5–7), flute (2, 3, 5–7), tenor saxophone solo (1, 2, 7, 9), alto saxophone solo (5)
 Larry Williams – saxophone and flute (2)
 David J. "Hawk" Wolinski – Clavinet (1, 9), mini-Moog (5), bass synthesizer (6),  synth programming (5, 9)
 Stevie Wonder –synthesizer (2, 4), rhythm arrangements (4)
 Syreeta Wright – backing vocals (2)

Charting history

Album

Charting singles

Certifications and sales

Notes 

 The figure of "The Dude" featured in the album cover was created by Zambian sculptor Fanizani Akuda.
 "Just Once" was featured in the 1982 film The Last American Virgin.
 "One Hundred Ways" was sampled by MF Doom for the track "Rhymes Like Dimes", from his debut solo album, Operation: Doomsday.
 "Velas" was sampled by Jodeci on their 1996 single "Get On Up", as well as by producers Shut Up and Dance for the track "Waking Up", which appeared on Nicolette's first album, Now Is Early. The track was also featured as background music on The Weather Channel.

References 

1981 albums
Quincy Jones albums
A&M Records albums
Albums produced by Quincy Jones
Albums arranged by Quincy Jones